Econ usually refers to economics, a social science that analyzes the production, distribution, and consumption of goods and services.

Econ may also refer to:
Committee on Economic and Monetary Affairs (ECON), a committee of the European Parliament
Econ Engineering, a UK manufacturer of winter and road maintenance vehicle bodies
Econ group (Greece), a Greek conglomerate

See also 
Economics (disambiguation)